Bombay mix or Chanachur is a Bangladeshi-Indian snack mix (namkeen) which consists of a variable mixture of spicy dried ingredients, such as fried lentils, peanuts, chickpeas, chickpea flour ganthiya, corn, vegetable oil, puffed rice, fried onion and curry leaves. This is all flavored with salt and a blend of spices that may include coriander and mustard seeds.

Variations
Alternative, regional versions include:

 In Malaysia and Singapore, it is known as kacang putih. Members of the local Indian community usually refer to it as "mixture" as is done in the southern India. It is available from roadside vendors as well as shops and restaurants. Singaporean supermarket Fairprice refer to their Bombay mix as murukku, which is an entirely different product altogether.
 In southern states such as Tamil Nadu and Kerala, as well as in the north of Sri Lanka, it is known as just "mixture", and is available in almost all the sweet shops and bakeries. Usually it consists of fried peanuts, thenkuzhal, kara boondhi, roasted chana dal, karasev, murukku broken into small pieces, pakoda and oma podi.

See also
 Bhelpuri
 Sev mamra
 List of snack foods
 List of Indian snack foods
 Makka poha
 ''Bikaneri bhujia

References

Indian cuisine
Indian snack foods
Indian fast food
Indian cuisine in the United Kingdom
Culture of Mumbai
Gujarati cuisine
Bengali cuisine
Bangladeshi cuisine
Bangladeshi snack foods